.ad is the Internet country code top-level domain (ccTLD) for Andorra. It is administered by Andorra Telecom.

Because .ad is also an abbreviation for the word advertisement or advert, .ad has also been used in an unconventional manner as a domain hack by some advertising media.

See also
 .cat

External links 
 IANA .ad whois information
 STA Homepage

Communications in Andorra
Country code top-level domains
Council of European National Top Level Domain Registries members
Computer-related introductions in 1996